The Col des Nuages derailment was a train derailment that occurred in eastern French Indochina, in modern-day Vietnam, on 24 June 1953, during the First Indochina War. Railway officials announced the day after that "about 100 or more" were killed when a passenger train plunged 50 feet through a sabotaged viaduct.

Two locomotives and 18 cars crashed down in a ravine at the Col des Nuages (Pass of the Clouds, known now as the Hai Van Pass), a mountain pass on the route between the ancient Vietnamese capital of Huế and the port of Tourane (Đà Nẵng). The pass had frequently been the scene of attacks by the communist-directed Viet Minh rebels.

Officials said that a strong explosive charge detonated just as the train arrived at the viaduct, tumbling a 25-foot span into the ravine.

See also
 Railway accidents in Vietnam

References

 
 
 

Railway accidents in 1953
Derailments in Vietnam
1953 in Vietnam
1953 disasters in Vietnam
History of Da Nang
History of Huế
Bridge disasters in Vietnam
Train wrecks caused by sabotage
Bridge disasters caused by warfare
First Indochina War
June 1953 events in Asia